A gutta is a small water-repelling projection used in classical architecture.

Gutta may also refer to:


Entertainment
Gutta (album), the debut studio album by American rapper Ace Hood
Gutta Mixx, an album by rapper Bushwick Bill
Gutta på tur, a Norwegian travel-TV show

Medicine and biology
Gutta-percha, trees of the genus Palaquium and the rigid natural latex produced from the sap of these trees
Drop (unit) or guttae in Latin

Places in India
Chandrayan Gutta, a suburb in Hyderabad, India
Govinda Rajula Gutta, a historical place in Telangana, India
Jagathgiri Gutta, a colony and a ward in Telangana, India
Doli Gutta, a mountain peak in the northern part of the Deccan Plateau in India

Other
Gutta (name)